Odelya Halevi (born February 12, 1989) is an Israeli actress who appears on the American drama series Law & Order and plays the role of Assistant District Attorney Samantha Maroun. She also played Angelica in the American TV series Good Trouble and also appeared on Good Girls Revolt. She has made appearances in shows such as Mike & Molly, New Girl, NCIS, MacGyver (2016) and Why Women Kill.

Early life
Born in Rosh HaAyin, Israel, Halevi is the second oldest of six children. Her parents are a teacher and a retired firefighter. She is a Sephardic Jew whose grandparents immigrated to Israel from Yemen. As a child she attended Orthodox girls school where she would write and perform small plays each month for Rosh Chodesh. “I don’t remember a time when I didn’t want to be an actor,” she said. “It’s the need to be loved and liked, wanting people to look up to you in some way. It’s a validation.”.

At 19, Halevi completed her one year mandatory military service in the Israeli Defence Force. That same year, Halevi obtained a work permit and moved to Los Angeles to pursue acting. She briefly returned home to Israel but ultimately "followed her heart" and came back to Los Angeles the following year.

Filmography

Film

Television

References

External links 
 
 

1989 births
Living people
Jewish Israeli actresses
Israeli television actresses
21st-century Israeli actresses
Israeli expatriate actresses in the United States
People from Rosh HaAyin